Aglae is a genus of bees. 

Aglae or AGLAE may also refer to:

 Aglaé, a feminine given name
 French frigate Aglaé (1788), a French Navy frigate
 Accélérateur Grand Louvre d'analyse élémentaire (AGLAE), a particle physics facility in the Musée du Louvre, Paris

See also
 Aglaea, five figures in Greek mythology